The "world's largest cashew tree" may refer to one of two trees in Brazil:

 Cashew of Pirangi (O Cajueiro de Pirangi), said to cover between 7,300 and 8,400 square metres
 Cashew of A Praia (O Cajueiro da Praia), said to cover 8,800 square meters